Pseudodacryodes is a monotypic genus of flowering plants belonging to the family Burseraceae. The only species is Pseudodacryodes leonardiana.

Its native range is Western Central Tropical Africa.

References

Burseraceae
Burseraceae genera
Monotypic Sapindales genera